; 26 June 1940 – 14 August 2021) was a Japanese singer, actor and tarento.

Fujio was represented with Office Kiko. He was known for one of his songs "Tōku e Ikitai". Fujio dropped out from Senshi University Keio High School. His daughters were former actresses Miki Fujio and Aki Fujio. Fujio's ex-wife was singer and tarento Tomoko Watanabe. He died in Yokohama of acute pneumonia.

Discography

Filmography

Films

TV series

Direct-to-video

Advertisements

Radio

Kōhaku Uta Gassen contestant history

References

External links
 
Jerry Fujio at the TV Drama Database 

Jerry Fujio at Allcinema 
Jerry Fujio at Kinenote 

 

1940 births
2021 deaths
Japanese entertainers
Musicians from Shanghai
Japanese people of British descent
20th-century Japanese male actors
21st-century Japanese male actors
Male actors from Shanghai
20th-century Japanese male singers
20th-century Japanese singers